Nick Christensen (born 28 August 1985) is a Danish professional football forward.

References

External links
Career statistics at Danmarks Radio

1985 births
Living people
Danish men's footballers
Lyngby Boldklub players
Ølstykke FC players
Næstved Boldklub players
AC Horsens players
Akademisk Boldklub players
Danish Superliga players

Association football forwards